Jeel Albena Association for Humanitarian Development, also known as Jeel Albena, is a Yemeni not for profit organisation, founded by Ameen Jubran in 2017. It won the Nansen Refugee Award in 2021.

Nomenclature 
Jeel is Arabic for generation and Albena is Arabic for building.

Organisational history 
Jeel Albena was founded by chemist Ameen Jubran (born 1984) in June 2017. The organisation has the motto “By Yemenis, for Yemenis.” In September 2021, Jeel Albena had over 150 employees.

Jeel Albena won the Nansen Refugee Award in 2021.

Activities 
Jeel Albena's headquarters are in Al Hudaydah and it provides skills training and shelter provision in the Al Hudaydah, Hajjah, Al Mahwit and Raymah areas of Yemen.

References

External links 

 Official website

Organizations established in 2017
Charities based in Yemen
2017 establishments in Yemen
Nansen Refugee Award laureates